Arreux is a commune in the Ardennes department in the Grand Est region of northern France.

The inhabitants of the commune are known as Cabres

The commune has been awarded one flower by the National Council of Towns and Villages in Bloom in the Competition of cities and villages in Bloom.

Geography

Arreux is located in a hilly area on the edge of The Ardennes some 9 km north-west of Charleville-Mézières and 3 km east by south-east of Renwez. Access to the commune is by road D22 from Montcornet in the west passing through the village and continuing east to Nouzonville. The D22 also forms the south-eastern border of the commune. Some two thirds of the commune is heavily forested - especially in the east, with some farmland around the village.

The Ruisseau du Fond d'Arreux forms the north eastern and north-western border of the commune as it flows around the commune and then away to the south-west. A stream rises south of the village and flows north to join the Ruisseau du Fond d'Arreux.

Toponymy
According to Ernest Nègre the name Arreux comes from aridus meaning "arid".

Heraldry

Administration

List of Successive Mayors

Demography
In 2017 the commune had 324 inhabitants.

Sites and monuments
The Church of Saint Lambert from 1811
The Chateau of Arreux (private property). The old Chateau of Arreux, shown in the Album of Croy, has not left any traces.
A Lavoir (public laundry) transformed into a library

See also
Communes of the Ardennes department

References

External links
Arreux official website 
Arreux on the National Geographic Institute website 
Areux on the 1750 Cassini Map

Communes of Ardennes (department)